Raúl Miguel Cámara (born 28 February 1984 in Madrid) is a Spanish former professional footballer who played mainly as a right-back.

External links

1984 births
Living people
Spanish footballers
Footballers from Madrid
Association football defenders
La Liga players
Segunda División players
Segunda División B players
Tercera División players
Sporting de Gijón B players
Sporting de Gijón players
Recreativo de Huelva players
Xerez CD footballers
CD Tenerife players
Córdoba CF players